The Sunnyvale Elementary School District is a public school district located in Sunnyvale, California.

The Sunnyvale Elementary School District is a feeder for the Fremont Union High School District and it is made up of ten schools, eight of which are elementary schools, and two which are middle schools. Bishop, Cherry Chase, Cumberland, Ellis, Fairwood,
Lakewood, San Miguel, and Vargas are the eight elementary schools. Columbia and Sunnyvale Middle School are the middle schools.

References

External links
 

School districts in Santa Clara County, California
Education in Sunnyvale, California